Pep Love is a hip hop artist and a member of the Oakland, California-based hip hop collective Hieroglyphics.

Personal life 
Born and raised in Jackson, Mississippi, Pep Love relocated with his family to Oakland, California as a teenager.

Discography 

Albums
 Ascension (2001)
 Ascension Side C (2003)
 The Shamen (2003) (with Jay Biz)
 The Foundation (2005)
 Rigmarole (2012)
 Fallacy Fantasy (2014) (with Opio as First Light)

EPs
 Dolla Daily (2014)
 Fly Philosophy (2017)
 Magnam Ostium (2020)

Singles
 "Crooked Angles" (2000)
 "Fight Club" (2001)
 "T.A.M.I." (2002)
 "Prayful' Hate" (2016) OKLM.

References

External links 
 
 

1974 births
Living people
Hieroglyphics (group) members
Musicians from Jackson, Mississippi
Rappers from Oakland, California
21st-century American rappers